Neighborhood Sessions is an American television concert series which celebrates the communities and people that inspired artists like Usher, Dave Matthews Band, Toby Keith, and Jennifer Lopez. It is broadcast on TNT Series and  sponsored by StateFarm.

References

English-language television shows
Concerts in the United States
2015 American television series debuts